Start can refer to multiple topics: 
Takeoff, the phase of flight where an aircraft transitions from moving along the ground to flying through the air
Starting lineup in sports
Standing start, and rolling start, in an auto race

Acronyms
Strategic Arms Reduction Treaties, a series of arms reduction treaties between the US and USSR
START I (1991)
START II (1993)
START III (1997), never signed into effect
New START (2010), initiated to continue the effects of previous START treaties
"START", a 2018 episode and the series finale of the period spy thriller The Americans
Simple triage and rapid treatment
Small Tight Aspect Ratio Tokamak
Spanish Technical Aid Response Team
Stanislaus Regional Transit, predecessor to the Stanislaus Regional Transit Authority

Books and publications
Start (newspaper), a daily tabloid published in Serbia
STart (magazine), an Atari ST publication
Start, by Susan Long (journalist)
Start, by Terry Virgo

Places
Start, Louisiana, a town in the United States
Start Point, Devon, site of many shipwrecks often referred to as "Start"
Start Point Lighthouse, built in 1836

Songs
"Start!", a 1980 song by The Jam
"The Start" (song), Maltese entry for Junior Eurovision 2013 sung by Gaia Cauchi
"The Start", single and EP by Headway
Start (Rina Aiuchi song)
"Start", a single by Korean singer Bada
"Start", a song by Peter Gabriel from Peter Gabriel

Technology
Start-1, a Russian launch vehicle
Start (command), a command in Windows
Start button
Start menu, element in the Windows GUI
Start screen (Windows)
Start signal, in telecommunications

Other
Start (Stefanie Sun album), 2002
Start (Mameshiba no Taigun album)
Start (cereal), a breakfast cereal produced by Kellogg's since the 1980s, mainly in the UK
Start (Polish camera), twin-lens reflex camera
Start (Soviet camera), single lens reflex camera
theStart (band), an American punk rock band
Start Nizhny Novgorod, a Russian bandy club
IK Start, a Norwegian football club from the town of Kristiansand
Start TV, an American TV network
Start (streaming service), a Russian streaming service

See also

Begin (disambiguation)
Origin (disambiguation)
Restart (disambiguation)
Source (disambiguation)
Start Point (disambiguation)